Mahur may refer to:

Geography 

 Mahur, Maharashtra, India
 Mahur, Assam, India
 Mahur, Iran, a village in Khuzestan Province, Iran
 Mahur-e Chah Gandali, a village in Khuzestan Province, Iran
 Mahur Berenji (disambiguation), places in Khuzestan Province, Iran
 Mahur-e Basht, a village in Kohgiluyeh and Boyer-Ahmad Province, Iran
 Mahur Rural District, in Fars Province, Iran

Music 

 Dastgāh-e Māhur is a mode (dastgah, maqam, mayeh), in Persian traditional music, identical to the Western major scale
 Mahur is a makam in the music of Turkey